No. 102 Squadron was a Royal Air Force night bomber squadron in the First World War and a heavy bomber squadron in the Second World War. After the war it flew briefly as a transport squadron before being reformed a light bomber unit with the Second Tactical Air Force within RAF Germany. Its last existence was as a Thor strategic missile unit.

History

Formation in the First World War
No. 102 squadron was formed in August 1917 as a night bomber unit at Hingham, Norfolk with the RAF F.E.2b and F.E.2ds. It moved to France and specialised in night attacks behind the German lines and in particular railway stations, railway lines, and railway trains. With the end of the first world war the squadron returned to England in March 1919. It disbanded at RAF Lympne on 3 July 1919.

Between the Wars
102 squadron was formed again on 1 October 1935 at RAF Worthy Down, using men and equipment from 'B' Flight of 7 Squadron. Still in its original role as a night bomber squadron 102 squadron first used the Handley Page Heyford.

In October 1938 the squadron became part of the newly formed No 4 Group (Bomber Command) based at RAF Driffield, Yorkshire and was re-equipped  with the Armstrong Whitworth Whitley.

Second World War

The squadron was active from the second day of the Second World War, dropping leaflets in the night from 4 to 5 September 1939 over Germany. From 1 September till 10 October 1940 the squadron was loaned to RAF Coastal Command and spent six weeks carrying out convoy escort duties from RAF Prestwick, before resuming bomber raids. Operations Record Books seen at the Public Record Office in Kew show that 2 Whitley Mk.Vs flew out of Topcliffe on 27 November 1940 to bomb "docks and shipping" at Le Havre. One of these planes "was not heard from after take off" but the other returned safely having dropped its two 500lb and six 250 lb bombs successfully. By February 1942, the squadron was adopted by Sri Lanka, then Ceylon, and the Whitleys were replaced by the Handley Page Halifax. The squadron continued for the next thirty-six months to fly night sorties (including the thousand bomber raids) over Germany. In 1944 the squadron attacked rail targets in France in preparation for the invasion.

To Transport Command
On 8 March 1945 the squadron was transferred to Transport Command and in September 1945 re-equipped with Consolidated Liberators. Based as RAF Bassingbourn. Its main role was the return of troops and POWs from India. With this work finished the squadron transferred on 15 February 1946 to RAF Upwood where it disbanded on 28 February 1946 by being renumbered to 53 Squadron. From 1 February 1949 to 19 October 1954 the squadron's numberplate was linked with that of 49 squadron, as 49/120 squadron.

Conversion to nuclear strike bomber squadron
On 20 October 1954 the squadron was reformed as part of RAF Germany as a nuclear strike bomber squadron with the English Electric Canberra B.2 based at RAF Gütersloh. It was disbanded again on 20 August 1956 when it was renumbered to 59 Squadron.

On missiles
The squadron was last reformed as No. 102 (SM) Squadron RAF (SM standing for "Strategic Missile") in August 1959, equipped with three PGM-17 Thor ballistic missiles, carrying a 1.4 megaton W-49 nuclear warhead, as part of the UK-US strategic deterrent, Project Emily. It was based at RAF Full Sutton in Yorkshire until it was disbanded, along with the other Thor squadrons, on 27 April 1963.

Aircraft operated

Trivia
Pilot Officer (later Flight Lieutenant) Alfred B. Thompson, a pilot in 102 Squadron, was (on 9 September 1939) the first Canadian to be captured in the Second World War, is the Canadian who was the longest held ever as a prisoner of war, and was a participant in the Great Escape (Stalag Luft III escape) (he was the 68th man to go out through the tunnel).

Leonard Cheshire was a Pilot Officer with 102 Squadron from July 1940. In November 1940 he was awarded the DSO for flying his badly damaged Whitley back to base.

The squadron was adopted by the island of Ceylon in February 1942, which paid for aircraft for use by the squadron.

The log book of Flight Lieutenant Leonard Todd DFC from August 1943 shows the frequency and range of the missions flown by the 102 Squadron.

See also
 List of Royal Air Force aircraft squadrons
 List of UK Thor missile bases

References

Citations

Bibliography

 Bowyer, Michael J.F. and John D.R. Rawlings. Squadron Codes, 1937–56. Cambridge, UK: Patrick Stephens Ltd., 1979. .
 Flintham, Vic and Andrew Thomas. Combat Codes: A full explanation and listing of British, Commonwealth and Allied air force unit codes since 1938. Shrewsbury, Shropshire, UK: Airlife Publishing Ltd., 2003. .
 Goss, Chris. It's Suicide but It's Fun, The Story of 102 (Ceylon) Squadron 1917–1956. Crécy Books, 1995. .
 Jefford, C.G. RAF Squadrons, a Comprehensive record of the Movement and Equipment of all RAF Squadrons and their Antecedents since 1912. Shrewsbury, Shropshire, UK: Airlife Publishing, 1988 (second edition 2001). .
 Moyes, Philip J.R. Bomber Squadrons of the RAF and their Aircraft. London: Macdonald and Jane's (Publishers) Ltd., 2nd edition 1976. .

External links

 RAF History – Bomber Command – No. 102 Squadron
 History of No.'s 101–105 Squadrons at RAF Web
 No. 102 Ceylon Squadron Association

Military units and formations established in 1917
102 Squadron
102 Squadron
Military units and formations of the Royal Air Force in World War I
Aircraft squadrons of the Royal Air Force in World War II
Ballistic missile squadrons of the Royal Air Force
1917 establishments in the United Kingdom
R